Little Boy Boo is a 1954 Warner Bros. Looney Tunes animated short directed by Robert McKimson. The cartoon was released on June 5, 1954, and features Foghorn Leghorn, Miss Prissy and Egghead Jr.

The cartoon was one of several in the Foghorn Leghorn series utilizing the theme of Foghorn attempting to woo the widowed Miss Prissy by babysitting her gifted son (Egghead, Jr.).

Plot
A newspaper story in the Barnyard News predicts a cold winter. To avoid freezing in his shack, Foghorn decides to woo Miss Prissy ("I need your love to keep me warm"), who lives in a warm, cozy cottage across the way. Miss Prissy is flattered by Foghorn's two-second courtship but tells him that, to prove his worthiness as her mate, he needs to show that he can be a worthy father to her bookish-looking son.

The little boy – Egghead Jr., a chick similar in appearance to Tweety, dressed in a stocking cap and oversized glasses – would rather read about "Splitting the Fourth Dimension" than engage in typical little boy games. Foghorn immediately catches on to this and sets out to win his audition by showing Egghead Jr. how to play various sports games.

Although he apparently has never participated in any of the below-listed events before, Egghead Jr. effortly masters them all, as depicted in the cartoon's gags:

 Baseball. After Egghead Jr. swallows the ball whole and clonks Foghorn over the head with the bat causing Foghorn to yell "NO! NO, boy! You're supposed to hit the ball with it! The ball!" the rooster has Egghead Jr. properly use both items. Egghead goes to bat and smashes a line drive down Foghorn's throat, and later fires a fast-pitch offering that slices through Foghorn's bat and a row of trees in the grove. When asked to explain, Egghead produces a series of scientific formulas.
 Making paper airplanes. Foghorn makes a conventional one, but Egghead Jr. creates a fighter that not only floats sleekly through the air, it shoots Foggy's plane down in flames. Foghorn is handed another scientific explanation, but Foghorn rejects.
 Hide and seek. Foghorn hides in the feedbox, but using a slide rule and a shovel, Egghead Jr. finds the rooster underground and digs him up despite the fact that Egghead is at a considerable distance from the feedbox. Flabbergasted at how the chick accomplished this, Foghorn decides not to look in the feedbox, declaring "No, I better not look. I just might be in there."

Foghorn tries to take an interest in Egghead Jr.'s pursuits. The chick is experimenting with formulas in his Tiny Tot Chemical Set (marked "harmless"). Foghorn assumes Egghead Jr. is making "sody-pop" and shakes it to make it fizz – which causes an explosion which burns off all his feathers in an instance, leaving him completely bare.

Foghorn returns Egghead Jr. home and cancels the engagement. "I've got my bandages to keep me warm!" he scowls as he walks off with a crutch and in a full-body bandage.

Voice Cast
 Mel Blanc voices Foghorn Leghorn, Egghead Jr.
 Gladys Holland voices Miss Prissy
 Additional Voices are provided by Bea Benaderet

References

External links

1954 animated films
1954 short films
1954 films
Looney Tunes shorts
Warner Bros. Cartoons animated short films
Films directed by Robert McKimson
1950s Warner Bros. animated short films
Films scored by Carl Stalling
1950s English-language films
Foghorn Leghorn films